Randy Fine (born April 20, 1974) is an American Republican politician and former gambling industry executive who was first elected to the Florida House of Representatives in 2016. His district covers southern Brevard County.

Background 
Fine was born in a Jewish family in Tucson, Arizona. He was raised in Lexington, Kentucky, graduating from Henry Clay High School in 1992. He spent his 11th grade year as a page in the US House of Representatives. During the summers of 1991 and 1992, he was an assistant for Robert Dornan.

He is a graduate of Harvard University.

Before entering politics, Fine worked as an executive for casino gambling companies such as Harrah's Entertainment and American Casino & Entertainment Properties. For nearly ten years, he operated a Nevada-based consulting business for the casino industry, called The Fine Point Group. In 2009, he was the chief executive of the Greektown Casino in Detroit.

Elections 
In 2015, Fine explored a US Senate bid.

Fine has won four elections in Florida's 53rd and 33rd House of Representatives districts. In 2016, Fine and David Kearns (Democrat) competed for the seat being vacated by John Tobia, who vacated the spot due to term limits. In 2018 and 2020 Fine was the incumbent, and he was challenged by Democrat Phil Moore in both elections. Following redistricting, Fine ran in the 33rd district in 2022, defeating Democrat Anthony Yantz.

In the legislature 
In the state legislature, Fine has been an advocate for protecting the environment of the Indian River Lagoon from sewage spills, and for opposing what he sees as wasteful, lower-priority spending. Fine has introduced a bill in the state legislature to provide up to $50 million per year in matching funds to upgrade sewage treatment facilities in the area of the marsh. The legislation also increases the fines for illegal sewage discharges. Despite his crusade against sewage spills, in 2019 he voted for HB 829  which made it illegal for local communities to ban the spreading of biosolids (dried sewage) on farmlands that drain into the St. John's River and The Indian River Lagoon. The practice of spreading dried human feces as fertilizer on farms around the St. John's River has been linked to toxic algae blooms affecting Melbourne's drinking water supply.

The editorial board of local newspaper Florida Today has criticized Fine's personal style. Their joint editorial observed that "Fine is obviously a hard working lawmaker who has used his watchdog skills to do good" but said that "Fine should defend what he believes in, but not by launching tirades against others as crusades on behalf of his constituents. He can look good without trying to make others look bad with personal attacks."

In 2018 Fine voted for H.B. 631, a controversial bill that gave many beachfront property owners in Florida the right to 'eject' people from the beach, while at the same time, he owned a beachfront property.

Israel and Palestine 

In 2018, Fine demanded that venues in Miami and Tampa cancel scheduled concerts with the New Zealand singer Lorde because she had previously cancelled a concert in Israel after being urged to do so by activists from the BDS movement. According to Fine, letting Lorde play would violate an anti-BDS law that the state enacted in 2016. The concerts went on as scheduled.

In April 2019, Fine called Paul Halpern, a Jewish constituent of his, a "Judenrat" for supporting an event that discussed the Israeli-Palestinian situation. Halpern stated, "That's the worst thing anyone can say to me. I'm someone who’s been a victim of anti-Semitism much of my life, and there’s no worse name you can call a Jewish person than 'Judenrat.' It tells me about the character of the person who said it, especially since he doesn’t know me."

In May 2021, amid the ongoing crisis in Israel and Palestine, Fine made several derogatory posts and comments on his Facebook and Twitter pages regarding Palestinians, including a celebration of the Israeli army's bombing of the Gaza Strip.

LGBT rights 

In April 2021, Fine was one of 77 Republicans in the House to vote yea on bill CS/HB 1475 which bars transgender girls and women from playing on girls' sports teams at public schools.

Reedy Creek Improvement District 

In 2022, Fine sponsored a bill that would dissolve any independent special district in Florida established prior to November 5, 1968, including the Reedy Creek Improvement District. The bill passed both the Florida House of Representatives and the Florida State Senate, and was signed into law by Governor Ron DeSantis on April 22, 2022. Many political commentators said that the potential dissolution was in retaliation for Disney announcing its opposition to the Parental Rights in Education Act, dubbed the "Don't Say Gay Bill" by its critics, that passed several weeks prior. In an interview, Fine said that research into the RCID and other special districts started "When Disney kicked the hornet's nest several weeks ago." When the potential impact on taxes in the surrounding  counties of Orange and Osceola was being discussed, Fine claimed, without providing evidence, that the taxpayers would save money, and the tax revenue would instead go to local governments. Neither county is part of Fine's district.

Controversy

There are multiple cases of Fine using "threats to pull or withhold state funding...to strike back at political rivals and retaliate over perceived slights." These include the Brevard Zoo (2023), a Palm Bay Magnet High School firefighter academy (2022), and the West Melbourne Special Olympics (2021).

Personal Life
Fine's father, H. Alan Fine, a graduate of MIT, was professor of engineering at University of Kentucky.

Fine married his first wife, Anne Price, in 1996. They met while working for Students for an Energy Efficient Environment Inc.

In 2007, with his second wife Wendy, he purchased a 4,000 square foot home in Melbourne Beach, to which they added 4,500 square feet at a cost of $1,000,000.

References

1974 births
Living people
Republican Party members of the Florida House of Representatives
Harvard College alumni
Harvard Business School alumni
Jewish American state legislators in Florida
Politicians from Tucson, Arizona
People from Melbourne Beach, Florida
2020 United States presidential electors
21st-century American politicians
21st-century American Jews